Cerithium rehderi is a species of sea snail, a marine gastropod mollusk in the family Cerithiidae. They are found near the Marquesas Islands in French Polynesia.

Description

References

Cerithiidae
Gastropods described in 1992